The Slamgeesh Range is a small subrange of the Skeena Mountains of the Interior Mountains, located between the Skeena River and Slamgeesh River in northern British Columbia, Canada. The Mosque River, a tributary of the Skeena, flows through the Slamgeesh Range.

References

Slamgeesh Range in the Canadian Mountain Encyclopedia

Skeena Mountains